Amioides polyacanthus is a species of fish in the family Apogonidae, the cardinalfishes. This species is the only known member of its genus.

References

Apogoninae
Perciformes genera
Monotypic ray-finned fish genera
Monotypic marine fish genera
Taxa named by Léon Vaillant
Fish described in 1912